Savant Young (born June 19, 1976) is an American retired mixed martial artist. A professional competitor from 1998 until 2013, he competed for the WEC, Bellator, Shooto, Affliction, the Tokyo Sabres of the IFL, King of the Cage, and Tachi Palace Fights.

Mixed martial arts career
Although his first professional bout was in 1998, in June 2006 Young decided he wanted to begin training mixed martial arts full-time. In February 2007 Young won his first fight in the International Fight League by defeating Ed West with a unanimous decision. Young compiled a 2-2 record with the IFL, and that gave him an opportunity to fight Takeshi Inoue at Shooto. Despite Inoue being heavily favored, Young pulled off the upset and beat him by unanimous decision. Young has stated that this win is the reason he was offered a fight contract with the new Affliction Clothing Promotion. Young fought at their first event, Affliction: Banned, losing by second-round armbar against UFC veteran Mark Hominick.

Outside MMA
While training part-time, Young worked in post-production at a video editing company, making the feats of others come alive on the screen. An avid video game player, Young has also had a lifelong fascination with cars, building and competing with them in street races while in high school.

Personal life
Savant and his wife Rahima have two children, a girl and a boy. His mother's name is Debra Baldwin.

Mixed martial arts record

|-
| Win
| align=center| 11–9
| Mike Guymon
| KO (punch)
| Bellator 85
| 
| align=center| 2
| align=center| 0:48
| Irvine, California, United States
|Lightweight bout.
|-
| Loss
| align=center| 10–9
| Rob Emerson
| Submission (rear-naked choke)
| TPF 12: Second Coming
| 
| align=center| 3
| align=center| 4:29
| Lemoore, California, United States
|Catchweight (149 lbs) bout.
|-
| Win
| align=center| 10–8
| Robert Washington
| Submission (guillotine choke)
| TPF 11: Redemption
| 
| align=center| 2
| align=center| 2:41
| Lemoore, California, United States
|Lightweight bout.
|-
| Loss
| align=center| 9–8
| Mark Hominick
| Submission (armbar)
| Affliction: Banned
| 
| align=center| 2
| align=center| 4:25
| Anaheim, California, United States
|
|-
| Win
| align=center| 9–7
| Takeshi Inoue
| Decision (unanimous)
| Shooto: Shooto Tradition 1
| 
| align=center| 2
| align=center| 5:00
| Tokyo, Japan
|Featherweight debut.
|-
| Loss
| align=center| 8–7
| Deividas Taurosevicius
| Decision (unanimous)
| IFL- 2007 Semifinals
| 
| align=center| 3
| align=center| 4:00
| East Rutherford, New Jersey, United States
| 
|-
| Loss
| align=center| 8–6
| Ryan Schultz
| Decision (unanimous)
| IFL-Everett
| 
| align=center| 3
| align=center| 4:00
| Everett, Washington, United States
| 
|-
| Win
| align=center| 8–5
| Adam Lynn
| KO (punch)
| IFL-Los Angeles
| 
| align=center| 2
| align=center| 0:21
| Los Angeles, California, United States
| 
|-
| Win
| align=center| 7–5
| Ed West
| Decision (unanimous)
| IFL-Houston
| 
| align=center| 3
| align=center| 4:00
| Houston, Texas, United States
| 
|-
| Win
| align=center| 6–5
| Danny Suarez
| KO (superman punch)
| BIB-Beatdown in Bakersfield
| 
| align=center| 1
| align=center| 2:32
| Bakersfield, California, United States
| 
|-
| Loss
| align=center| 5–5
| Gabe Ruediger
| Submission (armbar)
| PF 1-The Beginning
| 
| align=center| 3
| align=center| 1:29
| Hollywood, California, United States
|Lightweight debut.
|-
| Loss
| align=center| 5–4
| Chris Lytle
| Submission (strikes)
| WEC 18: Unfinished Business
| 
| align=center| 1
| align=center| 3:50
| Lemoore, California, United States
| 
|-
| Loss
| align=center| 5–3
| John Alessio
| Submission (rear-naked choke)
| KOTC: Shock and Awe
| 
| align=center| 3
| align=center| 2:09
| Edmonton, Alberta, Canada
|Welterweight debut.
|-
| Win
| align=center| 5–2
| Kendall Grove
| Technical Submission (choke)
| LIP 1: Lockdown in Paradise 1
| 
| align=center| 1
| align=center| 2:00
| Lahania, Hawaii, United States
|Catchweight (192 lbs) bout; Grove missed weight.
|-
| Win
| align=center| 4–2
| Marcus Vinicios
| Decision
| XP 2: Xtreme Pankration 2
| 
| align=center| N/A
| align=center| N/A
| Los Angeles, California, United States
| 
|-
| Loss
| align=center| 3–2
| Jason Von Flue
| KO (punch)
| IFC WC 5: Warriors Challenge 5
| 
| align=center| 1
| align=center| 0:05
| Fresno, California, United States
| 
|-
| Win
| align=center| 3–1
| Victor Hunsaker
| Submission (heel hook)
| NG 9: Neutral Grounds 9
| 
| align=center| 1
| align=center| 1:55
| California, United States
| 
|-
| Win
| align=center| 2–1
| Ronnie Barnwell
| Submission (guillotine choke)
| NG 9: Neutral Grounds 9
| 
| align=center| 1
| align=center| 1:50
| California, United States
| 
|-
| Loss
| align=center| 1–1
| Scott Herman
| Decision
| Neutral Grounds 5
| 
| align=center| 1
| align=center| 8:00
| United States
| 
|-
| Win
| align=center| 1–0
| Thomas Kenny
| Submission (armbar)
| ES 2: Extreme Shoot 2
| 
| align=center| 2
| 
| Mission Viejo, California, United States
|

References

External links 
 
 Savant Young IFL Page
 International Fight League

Living people
1976 births
American male mixed martial artists
African-American mixed martial artists
21st-century African-American sportspeople
20th-century African-American sportspeople